Aditya Nath Jha (18 August 1911 – 1972) of the Indian Civil Service (ICS) was the recipient of the Padma Vibhushan in 1972 in the civil services category. He belonged to the 1936 batch of the ICS.

Jha was the son of Sir Ganganath Jha, and the brother of Shri Amarnath Jha, a scholar of English and Sanskrit and former vice-chancellor of Allahabad University. Educated at Allahabad University, he entered the ICS on 16 September 1936, completing his ICS probationary training at Jesus College, Oxford.   He served in the United Provinces as an assistant magistrate and collector before transferring to the Indian Political Service in November 1939. At the time of independence, he was secretary to the Resident for the Eastern Princely States.

Post-independence, Jha served as Chief Secretary of Uttar Pradesh,  as the first director of the National Academy of Administration, Mussorie, Secretary to the Government of India and first Lieutenant Governor of Delhi.

Jha was known for his administrative acumen and his wide-ranging knowledge of cultures and languages. Descended from a family of Sanskrit scholars, Jha was a fluent Sanskrit speaker.  While serving as Chief Secretary of Uttar Pradesh he was also concurrently Vice Chancellor of the Sanskrit University in Varanasi.

Early life and education 
Jha was son of Ganganath Jha and brother of Amarnath Jha who had been the Vice Chancellor of the Allahabad University, and then the Chairman of the Bihar Civil Service Commission.

He was educated at Allahabad University and Jesus College, Oxford. He served as Vice Chancellor of the Sanskrit University, Benares. He wrote a book on Indian philosophy titled ‘'Bharatiya Darshanon ka Samanvay''. He was an avid tennis player both in India and at Oxford University, where he was an ICS probationer. He joined as an Indian Civil Service (ICS) officer in 1936.

He served as Assistant Magistrate and Collector before transferring to the Indian Political Service in 1939. At the time of Independence, he was serving as secretary to the Resident for the Eastern Princely States.

Post-Independence, he served as the first Director of National Academy of Administration, Mussoorie from 1959- 1962. He was Chief Secretary of Uttar Pradesh, and later an Additional Secretary to Government of India, in the Planning Commission. In the mid-1960s, he served as Secretary of the Ministry of Information and Broadcasting. Between 1966-1972 he was the first Lt. Governor of Delhi. He was a recipient of the Padma Vibhushan in 1972 in the civil services category.

Tenure as Director, National Academy of Administration 
He was selected as the Director of Academy by former Home Secretary of India, Shri B. N. Jha. He contributed multiple books on philosophy and literature to the library (the famous Gandhi Smriti Library) at academy.

External Links and books 

 Page 30-31 Without Fear or Favour-An autobiography, Joginder Singh, Fusion Books, 2005.
 Page 30-31- an excerpt from the book From Powerless Village to Union Power Secretary, an autobiography by P. Abraham, Concept Pub. Co., 2009
 Page 30-31 Without Fear or Favour-An autobiography, Joginder Singh, Fusion Books, 2005

References

1911 births
1972 deaths
People from Bihar
Indian Civil Service (British India) officers
Recipients of the Padma Vibhushan in public affairs
Lieutenant Governors of Delhi
Indian Political Service officers